Ross Roberts may refer to:

 Ross Thompson Roberts (1938–1987), United States federal judge
 Ross Roberts (sport shooter), Bermudian 50m prone rifle shooter